The Bhubaneswar ITIR is one of the planned 40 "Information Technology Investment Regions" in India. It is proposed over an area of about 40.5 km2 (10000 acres) in Bhubaneswar in the region encompassing Infocity-I and Infocity-II. The Detailed Project Report (DPR) is being prepared by IL&FS Infrastructures Ltd in collaboration with the state-owned Industrial Infrastructure Development Corp (IDCO).

Timeline
 ITIR reduced by 6–7 km2 due to the proposed IIT and International Airport.

References

Information Technology Investment Regions
Economy of Bhubaneswar